Hemithea tritonaria is a species of moth of the  family Geometridae. It is found in eastern Asia, including Japan, Thailand and the Korean Peninsula.

The wingspan is 25–28 mm.

External links
Japanese Moths

Hemitheini
Moths of Japan
Moths described in 1863